Max Zilzer (23 November 1868, in Budapest – 1943, in Berlin) was a Hungarian-born German stage and film actor.

Zilzer was Jewish and died under interrogation by the Gestapo during World War II. He was the father of actor Wolfgang Zilzer.

Selected filmography
 He This Way, She That Way (1915)
 The Secret of the American Docks (1919)
 The Eyes of the World (1920)
 The Bull of Olivera (1921)
 Debit and Credit (1924)
 Cock of the Roost (1925)
 Luther (1928)
 Panic (1928)
 Girl in the Moon (1929)
 A Student's Song of Heidelberg (1930)
 Raid in St. Pauli (1932)

Bibliography
 Jung, Uli & Schatzberg, Walter. Beyond Caligari: The Films of Robert Wiene. Berghahn Books, 1999.

External links

1868 births
1943 deaths
German male film actors
German male stage actors
German male silent film actors
Male actors from Budapest
20th-century German male actors
German people of Jewish descent
Hungarian people of Jewish descent
German Jews who died in the Holocaust